Homa is an extinct South Sudanese Bantu language of uncertain affiliation. It has been included in the Boan languages.

References

Boan languages
Languages of South Sudan

Extinct languages of Africa